The Known World is a 2003 historical novel by Edward P. Jones. Set in Virginia during the antebellum era, it examines the issues regarding the ownership of Black slaves by both white and Black Americans.

The book was published to acclaim, which praised its story and Jones's prose. In particular, his ability to intertwine stories within stories received great praise from The New York Times.

The narration of The Known World is from the perspective of an omniscient figure who does not voice judgment. This allows the reader to experience the story without bias.

Awards and nominations
The novel won a National Book Critics Circle Award and the Pulitzer Prize for Fiction in 2004. In 2005, it won the International Dublin Literary Award, one of the richest literary awards for a novel in the English language. It was a finalist for the 2003 National Book Award.

In 2009, the website The Millions polled 48 critics, writers, and editors; the panel voted The Known World the second best novel since 2000. In 2015, the BBC polled American critics and ranked The Known World the "second greatest novel of the 21st century so far".

References

Further reading

External links
Interviews
Edward P. Jones on 'The Known World', official HarperCollins interview.
Interview with the author, transcript from NewsHour with Jim Lehrer, PBS, September 19, 2003
'The Known World', audio from National Public Radio, Morning Edition, October 28, 2003
 
Reviews
Page not found 'The Known World', review in Pop Matters, by Stephen M. Deusner, 5 January 2004 
Page not found 'The Known World' review in storySouth, 2005
Page not found 'The Known World', review in The Washington Post, by Jonathan Yardley, August 24, 2003
"People who owned people", review in The New York Times, by John Vernon, August 31, 2003
"A transcendent story of slavery unfolds in black and white", review in The Boston Globe, by John Freeman, October 19, 2003
Misc
Photos of the first edition of The Known World
Two-part essay on Jones' use of a godlike omniscient narrator in "The Known World": Part 1, Part 2.

2003 American novels
Pulitzer Prize for Fiction-winning works
American historical novels
Novels about American slavery
Novels set in Virginia
Amistad Press books
African-American novels
Works by Edward P. Jones
2003 debut novels